Turkey competed at the 2014 Winter Olympics in Sochi, Russia from 7 to 23 February 2014. Turkey's team consists of six athletes in three sports.

Competitors

Alpine skiing 

According to the quota allocation released on January 20, 2014, Turkey has qualified two athletes.

Cross-country skiing 

According to the quota allocation released on January 20, 2014, Turkey has qualified two athletes.

Distance

Sprint

Figure skating 

Turkey has qualified to compete in ice dancing for the first time.

References

External links 
Turkey at the 2014 Winter Olympics

Nations at the 2014 Winter Olympics
2014
Winter Olympics